The 2012–13 VCU Rams men's tennis team will represent Virginia Commonwealth University during the 2012–13 NCAA Division I men's tennis season. It will be the Rams' first season playing in the Atlantic 10 Conference.

Roster

Schedule

2013 team season

Rankings

See also 
 VCU Rams men's tennis

References 

Vcu Rams
VCU Rams men's tennis seasons